Oleksiy Zhukov (born 30 March 1964) is a Ukrainian bobsledder. He competed in the two man and the four man events at the 1994 Winter Olympics.

References

1964 births
Living people
Ukrainian male bobsledders
Olympic bobsledders of Ukraine
Bobsledders at the 1994 Winter Olympics
People from Yessentuki